SCCSD may refer to:
 Sioux City Community School District, Sioux City, Iowa
 South Country Central School District, Brookhaven, New York
 Sunflower County Consolidated School District, Sunflower County, Mississippi